Karaburun Peninsula may refer to:
Karaburun Peninsula, Albania, a peninsula in Albania
Karaburun Peninsula, Turkey, a peninsula in Turkey